Goldfield or Goldfields may refer to:

Places
 Goldfield, Arizona, the former name of Youngberg, Arizona, a populated place in the United States
 Goldfield, Colorado, a community in the United States
 Goldfield, Iowa, a city in the United States
 Goldfield, Nevada, a town in Esmeralda Country, United States
 Gold Fields (New Zealand electorate)
 Goldfields, Queensland, a locality in the Southern Downs Region, Australia
 Goldfields, Saskatchewan, an abandoned hamlet in Canada
 An area where gold mining occurs or has historically occurred:
 Goldfields region of Victoria, Australia 
 Kolar Gold Fields, a major gold mine in India
Western Australian Goldfields, a term for areas in Western Australia where gold mining has occurred at any time
 Goldfields–Esperance, an officially-designated region of Western Australia
Eastern Goldfields, part of the Western Australian Goldfields in the Goldfields-Esperance region
Places designated as Gold Fields or Mineral fields of Western Australia

Companies
Ashanti Goldfields Corporation, the former name of AngloGold Ashanti
 Consolidated Gold Fields, a British gold-mining company
 European Goldfields, a company operating in the EU
 Gold Fields, a South African gold mining company
 New Consolidated Gold Fields, an Estonian shale oil company

Other uses
 Goldfield (cigarette), a brand of cigarette
 Goldfields (video game), a 1986 educational game
 , a Panamanian steamship
 David Goldfield, historian

See also
 Goldfeld (disambiguation)